On My Way & Shoutin' Again! is an album released by pianist, composer and bandleader Count Basie featuring compositions by Neal Hefti recorded in 1962 and originally released on the Verve label.

Reception

Down Beat critic Harvey Pekar commented in his February 28, 1963 review: "... generally fine solo work and several admirable Hefti scores plus Basie's inevitably strong rhythm section - all of which adds up to a very good album." AllMusic reviewer Michael G. Nastos described the album as "A solid and worthwhile album that has been out of print for far too long, this will be a welcome addition to any Basie lover's collection, and comes highly recommended to anyone even mildly interested in excellent large-ensemble mainstream jazz".

Track listing
All compositions by Neal Hefti
 "I'm Shoutin' Again" - 3:50	
 "Ducky Bumps" - 3:35	
 "The Long Night" - 3:42	
 "Jump for Johnny" - 3:16	
 "Ain't That Right" - 2:50	
 "Together Again" - 2:44
 "Shanghaied" - 3:33
 "Skippin' with Skitch" - 4:02
 "Eee Dee" - 3:03
 "Rose Bud" - 3:38

Personnel 
Count Basie - piano
Al Aarons, Sonny Cohn, Thad Jones, Fip Ricard, Ernie Royal - trumpet
Henry Coker, Grover Mitchell, Benny Powell - trombone
Marshal Royal - alto saxophone, clarinet
Frank Wess - alto saxophone, tenor saxophone, flute
Eric Dixon - tenor saxophone, flute
Frank Foster, - tenor saxophone
Charlie Fowlkes - baritone saxophone, flute
Freddie Green - guitar
Buddy Catlett - bass
Sonny Payne - drums

References 

1962 albums
Count Basie Orchestra albums
Verve Records albums
Albums arranged by Neal Hefti